Adenophorus is a genus of ferns in the family Polypodiaceae, subfamily Grammitidoideae, according to the Pteridophyte Phylogeny Group classification of 2016 (PPG I). The genus is endemic to Hawaii.

Species
, the Checklist of Ferns and Lycophytes of the World accepted the following species and hybrids:
Adenophorus × abbottiae W.H.Wagner
Adenophorus abietinus (D.C.Eaton) K.A.Wilson
Adenophorus × carsonii Ranker
Adenophorus epigaeus (L.E.Bishop) W.H.Wagner
Adenophorus haalilioanus (Brack.) K.A.Wilson
Adenophorus hymenophylloides (Kaulf.) Hook. & Grev.
Adenophorus oahuensis (Copel.) L.E.Bishop
Adenophorus periens L.E.Bishop
Adenophorus sarmentosus (Brack.) K.A.Wilson
Adenophorus tamariscinus (Kaulf.) Hook. & Grev.
Adenophorus tenellus (Kaulf.) Ranker
Adenophorus tripinnatifidus Gaudich.

References

Polypodiaceae
Fern genera